is a Japanese shōjo manga series written and illustrated by Kyousuke Motomi.  After it ended in 2015, a sequel, titled , began publication later the same year.

Both series are published in North America by Viz Media.

Plot
Sixteen-year-old Fumi Nishioka is a homeless high school girl suffering from amnesia, often spending her nights in a secret unused room of the school. Despite having no memories, she chooses a positive outlook on life and is determined to find her "Prince Charming" in the future. One day however, she is found by Kyutaro Horikita, an unfriendly second-year student with a talent for cleaning, and is drawn into a mysterious door in the room through her classmate and delinquent Sakaguchi's voice calling for help. The door leads to the Void, a gateway linking thousands of people's minds, one of which is Sakaguchi's. Sakaguchi, who has been plagued by negative emotions and created a bug infestation in his mind, is cleansed by Kyutaro, who arrives just in time to save Fumi.

The school's chairman Koichi Horikita recognises Fumi's talent and decides to invite her as part of their family, explaining the situation to her. The Horikita family are "Sweepers", people who enter the mind vaults of others to cleanse their souls of bug infestations that are the result of uncontrollable negative emotions. As Fumi undergoes training to become a Sweeper and Kyutaro's partner, she stumbles upon an extraordinary power lying dormant inside her: the "Queen", a rare existence that can allow the bearer to have mind control over others. However, the Queen's power can be both evil and good, and some people are out to find her and capture her for their own deeds. Struggling with her training and romantic feelings for Kyutaro, Fumi attempts to search for an answer in her own soul and lost memories.

Characters

A "sweeper", or someone who exorcises malignant spirits created by troubled minds.

A homeless girl who begins to assist Kyutaro after encountering him at school.

Release
Kyousuke Motomi began serializing the manga in Shogakukan's shōjo magazine Betsucomi on 13 March 2014.  The series concluded on 13 May 2015, but was followed by a sequel called Queen's Quality, which debuted in the same magazine on 13 July 2015.

Viz Media announced their license to the series on 6 February 2015, with plans to begin publishing it under their Shojo Beat imprint in October 2015.  They announced their license to the sequel at Otakon in August 2016.

Volumes

Queen's Quality

{{Graphic novel list
 | VolumeNumber = 19
 | RelDate = 24 February 2023

Reception
Reviewing the first volume for Anime News Network, Rebecca Silverman gave it a grade of B.  She wrote that the while series "doesn't do a whole lot to distinguish itself or give us any major surprises, it is still a very enjoyable read filled with the humor and small romantic elements that Motomi does so well."  She noted that "it feels as if Motomi can't quite decide who is the point of view character. While there is no problem in manga with having more than one, the shifts here feel abrupt".  She was positive toward the series' art, commenting "Motomi's art is more refined than in Dengeki Daisy while still retaining her sharp look".  She concluded by writing that the series "isn't off to an amazing start, but it is a solid one that looks like it will build to Motomi's usual heights."

References

External links

  at Betsucomi 
 

Dark fantasy anime and manga
Romance anime and manga
Shogakukan manga
Shōjo manga
Supernatural anime and manga
Viz Media manga